Scopula orbeorum is a moth of the family Geometridae. It was described by Axel Hausmann in 1996. It is found in northern Iran.

References

Moths described in 1996
orbeorum
Endemic fauna of Iran
Moths of Asia